The Golden Globe Award for Best Actress – Miniseries or Television Film or Best Actress – Miniseries or Motion Picture Made for Television is a Golden Globe Award presented annually by the Hollywood Foreign Press Association (HFPA). It is given in honor of an actress who has delivered an outstanding performance in a leading role on a miniseries or motion picture made for television for the calendar year. The award was first presented at the 39th Golden Globe Awards on January 30, 1982, to Jane Seymour, for her performance in East of Eden (1981). Performances by actresses in a miniseries or television film were originally awarded in the Best Actress – Television Series Drama category, before the creation of this category.

Since its inception, the award has been given to 34 actresses. Kate Winslet is the current recipient of the award, for her performance in Mare of Easttown (2021). Ann-Margret, Judy Davis, and Helen Mirren and Winslet have won the most awards in the category, winning two times. Jessica Lange and Mirren have been nominated for the award on eight occasions, the most for the category.

Winners and nominees
Listed below are the winners of the award for each year, as well as the other nominees.

1980s

1990s

2000s

2010s

2020s

Superlatives

Multiple wins

Multiple nominations

See also
 Critics' Choice Television Award for Best Actress in a Movie/Miniseries
 Primetime Emmy Award for Outstanding Lead Actress in a Limited Series or Movie
 Screen Actors Guild Award for Outstanding Performance by a Female Actor in a Miniseries or Television Movie

References

Golden Globe Awards
 
Television awards for Best Actress